The government of Namibia consists of the executive, the legislative and the judiciary branches. The Cabinet is the executive organ of government, implementing the laws of the country. It consists of the president, the prime minister and his deputy, as well as the ministers of the Cabinet of Namibia. The legislative organs of government are the National Council and the National Assembly. They make the laws of the country. The judiciary organs of government are the courts. The highest court of Namibia is the Supreme Court. There are also the high courts and lower courts.

The Namibian government is partly centralised and partly regional. In the executive branch, central government consists of ministries, offices and agencies, whereas regional government consists of regional councils, and constituencies within these. The legislation is centralised in the lower house (National Assembly), and regional in the upper house (National Council). The judiciary is centralised in the Supreme Court, whereas high courts and lower courts are distributed all over the country.

Executive branch of government
The central executive branch of government consists of offices, ministries, and agencies. The offices of central government are:
 Office of the President (OP)
 Ministry of Gender Equality, Poverty Eradication and Social Welfare (MGEPESW)
 Office of the Prime Minister (OPM)
 Office of the Judiciary (OJ)

 there are 19 stand-alone ministries in Namibia. The Ministry of Gender Equality retained its minister in the 2020 downsizing of cabinet but falls under the Office of the President above.

 Ministry of Agriculture, Water and Forestry (MAWF)
 Ministry of Defence (MoD)
 Ministry of Education, Arts and Culture (MoE)
 National Library and Archives service (NLAS)
 Ministry of Environment, Forestry and Tourism (MEFT)
 Ministry of Finance (MoF)
 Ministry of Fisheries and Marine Resources (MFMR)
 Ministry of Health and Social Services (MHSS)
 Ministry of Higher Education, Training and Innovation (MHETI)
 Ministry of Home Affairs, Immigration, Safety and Security (MHAISS)
 Namibian Police Force
 Namibian Correctional Services
 Ministry of Industrialisation and Trade (MIT)
 Ministry of International Relations and Cooperation (MIRCo)
 Ministry of Information and Communication Technology (MICT)
 Ministry of Justice (MoJ)
 Ministry of Labour, Industrial Relations and Employment Creation (MOL)
 Ministry of Mines and Energy (MME)
 Ministry of Public Enterprises (MPE)
 Ministry of Sport, Youth and National Service (MSYNS)
 Namibia Sports Commission
 Ministry of Works and Transport (MoW)
 Namibia Civil Aviation Authority (NCAA)
 Directorate of Aircraft Accident Investigations (DAAI)
 Ministry of Urban and Rural Development (MURD)

The agencies of the central government are:
 Anti-Corruption Commission (ACC)
 Electoral Commission (EC)
 Central Intelligence Service (NCIS)
 National Planning Commission (NPC)
 Office of the Attorney General (OAG)
 Office of the Auditor-General (OAG)
 Office of the Ombudsman
 Public Service Commission of Namibia (PSC)

Government organisations and state-owned enterprises

The Namibian state runs and owns a number of companies such as Transnamib and NamPost, most of which need frequent financial assistance to stay afloat.

There is a number of agencies and authorities established by acts of Parliament that can be considered government organisations: 
 Council of Traditional Leaders 
 Law Reform and Development Commission (LRDC) commission responsible for research recommended law changes to the Ministry of Justice.
 Namibia Qualifications Authority (NQA). This institution evaluates and accredits national institutions and degrees, as well as foreign qualifications of people who wish to demonstrate the national equivalence of their degrees earned abroad.
 Namibia Tourism Board (NTB), the regulatory and marketing body for tourism activities in Namibia, and is headquartered in Windhoek, Namibia.

Traditional leadership

Alongside ordinary governance, Namibia also has a parallel system of traditional leadership. Only people of tribes recognised by the state, living in their traditional areas, are subject to this type of government which covers land allocation, traditional marriage, and lower courts. There are 51 recognised traditional authorities and a further 40 pending applications.

References

External links 
 Official website of the government of Namibia

 
1990 establishments in Namibia